Capay Valley is a mostly rural valley northwest of Sacramento in Yolo County, California, United States. It lies east of Blue Ridge and west of the Capay Hills.

Geography
Cache Creek flows through the valley.

California State Route 16 crosses through the Capay Valley.

The Capay Valley AVA, and American Viticultural Area (AVA) wine region, includes portions of the valley.

History
Capay Valley traditionally been the home of the Patwin or southern Wintun people. It is now the home of the Yocha Dehe Wintun Nation. The Cache Creek Casino Resort is in the valley.

The historic Mexican land grant of Rancho Canada de Capay formerly owned the valley in the 19th century.

See also
Ranchos of Yolo County, California
List of Ranchos of California
Ranchos of California
American Viticultural Area - AVA

Notes

Valleys of Yolo County, California
Valleys of California